Wendy White (born 1971) is an American artist from Deep River, Connecticut who lives and works in New York City.

Biography 
White studied fibers and was trained in fine art and textile design during her undergrad at Savannah College of Art & Design. She later studied painting at Mason Gross School of the Arts where she received her MFA.

Education 
Wendy White earned a BFA from Savannah College of Art & Design, Savannah, Georgia in 1993 and her MFA from Mason Gross School of the Arts at Rutgers University in 2003.

Solo exhibitions 
2019 Wendy White: Racetrack Playa, Shulamit Nazarian, Los Angeles, CA, USA
2018 Natural Light, Andrew Rafacz, Chicago, IL, USA
 2018 American Idyll, SCAD Museum of Art, Savannah, GA, USA
 2018 Rainbow Bridge, Kaikai Kiki, Tokyo, JP
 2018 Loves, SCAD Atlanta, Atlanta, GA, USA
 2018 Oil Slicks, David Castillo, Miami, FL, USA
 2017 Kelly Girl, VAN HORN, Dusseldorf, DE
 2016 Santa Cruz, Eric Firestone Gallery, New York, NY, USA
 2015 Skiing, Galerie Jérôme Pauchant, Paris, FR
 2015 Double Vanity, Sherrick & Paul, Nashville, TN, USA
 2015 Wendy White:12th Man, David Castillo Gallery, Miami, FL, USA
2014 El Campo, VAN HORN, Düsseldorf, DE (catalog)
2013 Curva, M Building, Miami, FL, USA
2013 Pick Up a Knock, Andrew Rafacz, Chicago, IL (catalog)
2013 Sports Moment, Makebish, New York, NY
2013 Wendy White, Maruani and Noirhomme, Brussels, Belgium (catalog)
2012 Pix Vää, Leo Koenig, Inc., New York, NY
2012 En Asfalto, Galeria Moriarty, Madrid, Spain
2012 Radio Lampor, VAN HORN, Düsseldorf, Germany
2011 6 Years/6 Works, University of Tennessee, Chattanooga, TN
2010 French Cuts, Andrew Rafacz Gallery, Chicago, IL
2010 Up w/Briquette, Leo Koenig, Inc, New York, NY (catalog)
2009 Feel Rabid or Not, Galeria Moriarty, Madrid, Spain
2008 Autokennel, Leo Koenig, Inc, New York, NY
2006 Chunk Lite, Solomon Projects, Atlanta, GA
2006 Wendy White, Sixtyseven, New York, NY
2003 Silver Tongued, Solomon Projects, Atlanta, GA
2000 Spilled in Spaces, Solomon Projects, Atlanta, GA

Group exhibitions 
White's group exhibitions include Perez Art Museum, Miami, FL; Los Angeles County Museum of Art (LACMA), Los Angeles, CA; The Royal Swedish Academy of Fine Arts, Stockholm, Sweden; Sotheby's S|2, Harris Lieberman, Nicole Klagsbrun, Marlboro Contemporary, Fredericks & Freiser (all New York, NY); CCA Andratx, Mallorca, Spain; Library Street Collective, Detroit, MI; Bemis Center for Contemporary Arts, Omaha, Nebraska; CCA Andratx, Mallorca, Spain; Kunstverein Rosa-Luxemburg-Platz, Berlin, Germany; Shulamit Nazarian, Los Angeles, CA; Dio Horia Gallery, Mykonos, Greece; Motus Fort, Tokyo, Japan; The Museum of Modern Art, Gunma, Japan; The Museum of Fine Arts, Gifu, Japan; Aschenbach & Hofland, Amsterdam, NL; and Indianapolis Museum of Contemporary Art, Indianapolis, Indiana, USA.

References

External links 
Wendy White’s Official Website
Wendy White at Andrew Rafacz Gallery
Wendy White at David Castillo Gallery
Review in Art in America
Review in Huffington Post
Review in BOMB magazine
Review in BOMB magazine 2009
Review in ArtForum
Wendy White Artist Statement, 2008
Freunde von Freunden interview with Wendy White
Wendy White at VAN HORN, Düsseldorf, GER

1971 births
Living people
Artists from Connecticut
20th-century American women artists
21st-century American women artists